In game theory, the price of stability (PoS) of a game is the ratio between the best objective function value of one of its equilibria and that of an optimal outcome. The PoS is relevant for games in which there is some objective authority that can influence the players a bit, and maybe help them converge to a good Nash equilibrium. When measuring how efficient a Nash equilibrium is in a specific game we often also talk about the price of anarchy (PoA), which is the ratio between the worst objective function value of one of its equilibria and that of an optimal outcome.

Examples
Another way of expressing PoS is:

 

In particular, if the optimal solution is a Nash equilibrium, then the PoS is 1.

In the following prisoner’s dilemma game, since there is a single equilibrium  we have PoS = PoA = 1/2.

The optimal value is 15. Thus, PoS = 1 while PoA = 1/5.

Background and milestones
The price of stability was first studied by A. Schulz and N. Stier-Moses while the term was coined by E. Anshelevich et al. Schulz and Stier-Moses focused on equilibria in a selfish routing game in which edges have capacities. Anshelevich et al. studied network design games and showed that a pure strategy Nash equilibrium always exists and the price of stability of this game is at most the nth harmonic number in directed graphs. For undirected graphs Anshelevich and others presented a tight bound on the price of stability of 4/3 for a single source and two players case. Jian Li has proved that for undirected graphs with a distinguished destination to which all players must connect the price of stability of the Shapely network design game is  where  is the number of players.

Network design games

Setup
Network design games have a very natural motivation for the Price of Stability.
In these games, the Price of Anarchy can be much worse than the Price of Stability.

Consider the following game.
  players;
 Each edge has a cost ;
 'Fair cost allocation': When  players choose edge , the cost  is split equally among them;
 The player cost is 
 The social cost is the sum of the player costs: .

Price of anarchy
The price of anarchy can be . Consider the following network design game.

Consider two different equilibria in this game. This equilibrium is indeed optimal. Note, however, that everyone sharing the  edge is a Nash equilibrium as well. Each agent has cost  at equilibrium, and

Lower bound on price of stability
Here is a pathological game in the same spirit for the Price of Stability, instead.
The cost of unlabeled edges is taken to be 0.

The optimal strategy is for everyone to share the  edge, yielding
total social cost . However, there is a unique Nash for this game.
Note that when at the optimum, each player is paying , and player 1 can decrease his cost by switching to the  edge. Once this has happened, it will be in player 2's interest to switch to the  edge, and so on. Eventually, the agents will reach the Nash equilibrium of paying for their own edge. Even though it is unbounded, the price of stability is exponentially better than the price of anarchy in this game.

Upper bound on price of stability
Note that by design, network design games are congestion games.
Therefore, they admit a potential function .

Theorem. [Theorem 19.13 from Reference 1] Suppose there exist constants  and 
such that for every strategy ,
 
Then the price of stability is less than 

Proof.
equilibrium, so
 

Now recall that the social cost was defined as the sum of costs over edges, so
 

We trivially have , and the computation above gives , so we may invoke the theorem for an upper bound on the price of stability.

See also 
 Price of anarchy
 Competitive facility location game - a game with no price-of-stability.

References

A.S. Schulz, N.E. Stier-Moses. On the performance of user equilibria in traffic networks. Proceedings of the 14th Annual ACM-SIAM Symposium on Discrete Algorithms (SODA), 2003.
E. Anshelevich, E. Dasgupta, J. Kleinberg, E. Tardos, T. Wexler, T. Roughgarden. The Price of Stability for Network Design with Fair Cost Allocation. SIAM Journal on Computing, 38:4, 1602-1623, 2008. Conference version appeared in FOCS 2004.

L. Agussurja and H. C. Lau. The Price of Stability in Selfish Scheduling Games. Web Intelligence and Agent Systems: An International Journal, 9:4, 2009.   
Jian Li. ''An  upper bound on the price of stability for undirected Shapely network design games. Information Processing Letters 109 (15), 876-878, 2009.

Game theory
Fixed points (mathematics)